Moss is a village and civil parish in the Metropolitan Borough of Doncaster in South Yorkshire, England.  It has a population of 290. increasing to 389 at the 2011 Census. From 1871 to 1953 the village was served by Moss railway station.

See also
Listed buildings in Moss, South Yorkshire

References

Villages in Doncaster
Civil parishes in South Yorkshire